John Joseph Egan (May 18, 1878 – February 1, 1949) was an American football player, coach, and physician.  He served as the co-head football coach at Villanova College—now known as Villanova University—in 1900 with John Powers. Together they compiled a record of 5–2–2 in one season. Egan then coached Villanova the following year alone and compiled a 2–3 record, making his overall head coaching record 7–5–2. Later, he also served as athletic director at the University of Maryland.

Egan was a doctor by profession and practiced as a surgeon in his hometown of Waterbury, Connecticut for 38 years.  He served as a major in the Medical Corps of the United States Army during World War II and was also a chief rating specialist at two Veterans' Administration offices in Connecticut.  Egan died at a Connecticut veterans' hospital in 1949 after a long illness.

Head coaching record

References

1878 births
1949 deaths
19th-century players of American football
Villanova Wildcats football coaches
Villanova Wildcats football players
United States Army personnel of World War II
United States Army officers
Sportspeople from Waterbury, Connecticut
Physicians from Connecticut
Coaches of American football from Connecticut
Players of American football from Connecticut